, born September 15, 1965, is a former professional baseball player from Kashiwa, Chiba, Japan. He last played with the Chiba Lotte Marines, and played in the major leagues with the New York Mets in 2002. He is currently the manager for the Waseda University baseball team.

Biography
Komiyama was a star on the Waseda University college baseball team, and was drafted by the Lotte Orions (current Chiba Lotte Marines) in the first round in 1989. He won 6 games as a rookie in 1990, and won 10 games in 1992, becoming the team's ace. He would be the opening-day starter for three consecutive years after this. In 1997, he won only 11 games, but recorded a 2.49 ERA, the best in the league. The Marines cut Komiyama in 1999, and he signed with the Yokohama BayStars, playing two seasons where he posted ERA's under 4.00 as a starter. He became a free agent, and signed with the New York Mets in 2002, but returned to Japan after the season. He spent 2003 in semi-retirement, working as a baseball commentator while continuing his training. He returned to the Chiba Lotte Marines in 2004, but was mostly unable to repeat his performances from earlier in his career with the team. However, he still managed to contribute to the team's championship in 2005, mostly pitching in long relief. In 2007, he revealed that he would throw pitches under-handed (submarine) as well as his usual over-handed form.

Komiyama has appeared as a baseball commentator numerous times, even though he is still an active player. He was rumored to start the 2007 season doubling as a relief pitcher and a pitching coach, but he has announced that he will not coach until after he has retired.

Pitching style
Komiyama was never regarded as a truly dominating starter, even in the Japanese leagues, as he never won more than 12 games in a season. He posted an ERA below 3.00 in two of his seasons in Japan, but won only 11 games in both those years, and he has more losses than wins in his career. Komiyama has been known to experiment with various pitches during the off-season, and his most recent pitch, the "shakeball" (a variant of the knuckleball only reaching 50~60 mph, or 80~90 km/h) has been somewhat successful against batters. In his prime, he mostly relied on good control and outsmarting hitters. His fastball falls in the mid 80 mph range, but he has a large assortment of pitches, and has used a slider, curve, splitter, changeup, cutter, sinker, and shootball at various points in his career.

External links

Japanese statistics from Japanese Baseball.com
Video clip of the shakeball

1965 births
People from Kashiwa
Baseball people from Chiba Prefecture
Chiba Lotte Marines players
Japanese expatriate baseball players in the United States
Living people
Lotte Orions players
Major League Baseball pitchers
Major League Baseball players from Japan
Nippon Professional Baseball pitchers
New York Mets players
Waseda University alumni
Yokohama BayStars players